The federal Volunteer Protection Act of 1997 (the VPA or the Act) aims to promote volunteerism by limiting, and in many cases completely eliminating, a volunteer's risk of tort liability when acting for nonprofit organizations or government entities. No volunteer of a nonprofit organization or governmental entity shall be liable for harm caused by an act or omission of the volunteer on behalf of the organization or entity.

Introduction
People who volunteer to assist nonprofit organizations or government agencies or programs run the risk that their actions, while well-intentioned, may cause harm to another. If those actions are deemed negligent, the volunteer may face civil liability for damages caused by the negligent conduct.

References

External links
 Volunteer Protection Act 

Charity law
Volunteering in the United States
Acts of the 105th United States Congress
Non-profit organizations based in the United States